Ngapuke or Ngāpuke is a village and rural community in the Ruapehu district and Manawatū-Whanganui region of New Zealand's North Island. It is located on the south side of the valley of Pungapunga River, a tributary of the upper Whanganui River, east of Taumarunui and west of Tongariro and Kuratau on State Highway 41.

In 1920, the settlement was a logging town for local forests. Since the 1950s it has been a farming community and outlying satellite town of Taumarunui.

The New Zealand Ministry for Culture and Heritage gives a translation of "the hills" for Ngāpuke.

Marae

The Kauriki Marae and Te Ōhākī meeting house is a tribal meeting place for the Ngāti Tūwharetoa hapū of Ngāti Hinemihi and Ngāti Turumakina.

In October 2020, the Government committed $1,560,379 from the Provincial Growth Fund to upgrade the marae and 7 other nearby marae, creating 156 jobs.

Maniaiti Marae is also located nearby.

Demographics

There were 474 households. There were 639 males and 624 females, giving a sex ratio of 1.02 males per female. The median age was 42.6 years (compared with 37.4 years nationally), with 255 people (20.2%) aged under 15 years, 225 (17.8%) aged 15 to 29, 561 (44.4%) aged 30 to 64, and 216 (17.1%) aged 65 or older.

Ethnicities were 73.9% European/Pākehā, 40.6% Māori, 2.1% Pacific peoples, 2.1% Asian, and 1.4% other ethnicities (totals add to more than 100% since people could identify with multiple ethnicities).

The proportion of people born overseas was 5.0%, compared with 27.1% nationally.

Although some people objected to giving their religion, 52.5% had no religion, 34.4% were Christian, 0.5% were Hindu, 0.2% were Buddhist and 2.6% had other religions.

Of those at least 15 years old, 66 (6.5%) people had a bachelor or higher degree, and 285 (28.3%) people had no formal qualifications. The median income was $27,600, compared with $31,800 nationally. The employment status of those at least 15 was that 510 (50.6%) people were employed full-time, 180 (17.9%) were part-time, and 33 (3.3%) were unemployed.

Education

The school was established in 1916 and celebrated its centenary in 2016 with an inter-generational game of Kī-o-rahi.

In recent years, the school has transitioned from English language mainstream schooling, to a Kuri a Iwi schooling model, in which children are taught in te reo Māori and connected to their ancestor.

References

Populated places in Manawatū-Whanganui
Ruapehu District